The Maule M-5 is an American four-seat cabin monoplane designed and built by the Maule Aircraft Company.

Design and development
The M-5 was a development of the earlier Maule M-4 with improved STOL performance. It has a 30% increase in flap area and enlarged tail surfaces.

Two prototype M-5s flew in 1971, one powered by a 210-hp (157 kW) engine, the other with a 220-hp (164 kW) engine.

The M-5 is a steel-tube and fabric high-wing braced-monoplane with a cantilever tailplane with a single fin and rudder. It has a fixed-tailwheel landing gear and an enclosed cabin with two rows of side-by-side seating for a pilot and three passengers. The aircraft entered production in 1974 and was named the Strata Rocket and the Lunar Rocket. A generally similar M-6 Super Rocket was also developed with a  wingspan and more fuel capacity, smaller ailerons and larger flaps.

Variants
M-5-180C
Initial production variant with a  Lycoming O-360-C1F engine, more than 94 built.
M-5-200
One aircraft modified with a  engine.
M-5-210C Strata Rocket
180C with a  Continental IO-360-D engine in a revised cowling, 206 built.
M-5-210TC Lunar Rocket
210C fitted with a turbocharged  Lycoming TO-360 engine, 10 built.
M-5-220C Lunar Rocket
210C fitted with a  Franklin 6A-350-C1 engine, 57 built.
M-5-235C Lunar Rocket
210C fitted with a  Lycoming O-540-J1A5D engine, more than 379 built.
M-6-235C Super Rocket
235C with a  wingspan and more fuel capacity, smaller ailerons and larger flaps, 136 built.

Specifications (M-5-235C Lunar Rocket)

References

 

1970s United States sport aircraft
M-05
Single-engined tractor aircraft
High-wing aircraft
Aircraft first flown in 1971